Rennes (Gallo: Resnn) is a city in the east of Brittany in northwestern France at the confluence of the Ille and the Vilaine. Rennes is the prefecture of the region of Brittany, as well as the Ille-et-Vilaine department. In 2017, the urban area had a population of 357,327 inhabitants, and the larger metropolitan area had 739,974 inhabitants. The inhabitants of Rennes are called Rennais/Rennaises in French.

Rennes's history goes back more than 2,000 years, at a time when it was a small Gallic village named Condate. Together with Vannes and Nantes, it was one of the major cities of the ancient Duchy of Brittany. From the early sixteenth century until the French Revolution, Rennes was a parliamentary, administrative and garrison city of the historic province of Brittany of the Kingdom of France as evidenced by its 17th century Parliament's Palace. Rennes played an important role in the Stamped Paper Revolt (Revolt of the papier timbré) in 1675. After the destructive fire of 1720, the medieval wooden center of the city was partially rebuilt in stone. Remaining mostly rural until the Second World War, Rennes really developed in the twentieth century.

Since the 1950s, Rennes has grown in importance through rural flight and its modern industrial development, partly automotive. The city developed extensive building plans to accommodate upwards of 200,000 inhabitants. During the 1980s, Rennes became one of the main centres in telecommunication and high technology industry. It is now a significant digital innovation centre in France. In 2002, Rennes became the smallest city in the world to have a Metro line.

Labeled a city of art and history, it has preserved an important medieval and classical heritage within its historic center with over 90 buildings protected as historic monuments. With more than 66,000 students in 2016, it is also the eighth-largest university campus of France. In 2018, L'Express named Rennes as "the most liveable city in France".

History

Administration
Since 2015, Rennes is divided into 6 cantons (populations as of 2019):
 Canton of Rennes-1 (40,588 inhabitants)
 Canton of Rennes-2 (42,446 inhabitants)
 Canton of Rennes-3 (43,683 inhabitants), which includes parts of Rennes but also the commune of Chantepie
 Canton of Rennes-4 (36,348 inhabitants)
 Canton of Rennes-5 (46,759 inhabitants), which includes parts of Rennes but also the commune of Saint-Jacques-de-la-Lande
 Canton of Rennes-6 (46,750 inhabitants), which includes parts of Rennes but also the commune of Pacé

Rennes is divided into 12 quarters:
 Centre
 Thabor - Saint-Hélier - Alphonse Guérin
 Bourg L’Évesque - La Touche - Moulin du Comte
 Saint-Martin
 Maurepas - Bellangerais
 Jeanne d’Arc - Longs Champs - Atlante Beaulieu
 Francisco Ferrer - Landry - Poterie
 Sud Gare
 Cleunay - Arsenal - Redon - La Courrouze
 Villejean - Beauregard
 Le Blosne
 Bréquigny

Mayors

The current mayor of Rennes is Nathalie Appéré. A member of the Socialist Party, she replaced retiring Socialist incumbent Daniel Delaveau, in office from 2008 to 2014.

 Edmond Hervé (b. 1942), Socialist mayor from 1977 to 2008;
 Henri Fréville (1905–1987), mayor MRP from 1953 to 1977;
 Eugène Quessot (1882–1949), interim mayor from 15 July 1947 until 26 October 1947;
 Yves Milon (1897–1987), mayor RPF from 1944 to 1953.

Among previous well-known mayors are:
 Jean Janvier (1859–1923), from 1908 to 1923;
 Edgar Le Bastard (1836–1891), from 1880 to 1891;
 Toussaint-François Rallier du Baty (1665–1734) from 1695 to 1734.

The  (city hall) is right in the centre of Rennes.

National representation
The French Prison Service operates the Centre pénitentiaire de Rennes, the largest women's prison in France.

Geography

The ancient centre of the town is built on a hill, with the north side being more elevated than the south side. It is at the confluence of two rivers: the Ille and the Vilaine.

Rennes is located on the European atlantic arc, 50 km from the English Channel (near Saint-Malo, Dinard and Mont Saint-Michel).

Rennes has the distinction of having a significant Green Belt around its ring road. This Green Belt is a protected area between the city proper (rather dense) and the rest of its urban area (rather rural).

Climate

Rennes features an oceanic climate. Precipitation in Rennes is considerably less abundant than in the western parts of Brittany, reaching only half of the levels of, e.g., the city of Quimper, which makes rainfall in Rennes comparable to the levels of larger parts of western Germany. Sunshine hours range between 1,700 and 1,850 annually, which is about the amount of sunshine received by the city of Lausanne.

Population
In 2018, the inner population of the city was of 221,272 inhabitants, the Rennes intercommunal structure connecting Rennes with 42 nearby suburbs (named Rennes Métropole) counted 450,593 inhabitants and the metropolitan area counted nearly 750,000 inhabitants.

Rennes has the second fastest-growing metropolitan area in France after Toulouse and before Montpellier, Bordeaux and Nantes.

The inhabitants of Rennes are called Rennais in French.

Sights
Rennes is classified as a city of art and history.

Historic centre

The historic centre is located on the former plan of the ramparts. There is a difference between the northern city centre and the southern city centre due to the 1720 fire, which destroyed most of the timber-framed houses in the northern part of the city. The rebuilding was done in stone, on a grid plan. The southern part, the poorest at this time, was not rebuilt.

Due to the presence of the parlement de Bretagne, many "hôtels particuliers" were built in the northern part, the richest in the 18th century. Most of the monuments historiques can be found there.

Colourful traditional half-timbered houses are situated primarily along the roads of Saint-Sauveur, Saint-Georges, de Saint-Malo, Saint-Guillaume, des Dames, du Chapitre, Vasselot, Saint-Michel, de la Psallette and around the plazas of Champ-Jacquet, des Lices, Saint-Anne and Rallier-du-Baty.

The Parlement de Bretagne and city hall area 
The Parlement de Bretagne (Administrative and judicial centre of Brittany) is the most famous 17th century building in Rennes. It was rebuilt after a terrible fire in 1994 that may have been caused by a flare fired by a protester during a demonstration. It houses the Rennes Court of Appeal. The plaza around is built on the classical architecture.

On the west, the Place de la Mairie (City Hall Plaza, Plasenn Ti Kêr):
 City Hall
 Opera

On the east, at the end of the Rue Saint-Georges with traditional half-timbered houses: 
 1920s Saint George Municipal Pool, with mosaics
 Saint George Palace, and its garden

On the south-east:
 Saint-Germain square
 Saint-Germain Church
 Saint-Germain footbridge, 20th century wood and metal construction to link the plaza with Émile Zola Quay, across the Vilaine River.

The Place des Lices and cathedral area 

The Place des Lices is lined by hôtels particuliers with the place Railler-du-Baty, is the location of the weekly big market, the marché des Lices.

Near the Rennes Cathedral (cathédrale Saint-Pierre de Rennes) is the Rue du Chapitre:
 Hôtel de Blossac
 There are 16th century polychrome wooden busts on the façade of 20, Rue du Chapitre.

On this era are the former St. Yves chapel, now the tourism office and a museum about the historical development of Rennes and the Basilica Saint-Sauveur.

Remains of the ramparts 
Built from the 3rd to the 12th centuries, the ramparts were largely destroyed between the beginning of the 16th century and the 1860s.

Place Saint-Anne area 

Place Saint-Anne (Plasenn Santez-Anna)
 Saint-Aubin Church, built in the beginning of the 20th century
 Location of a former 14th century hospital
 Jacobite convent, the convention centre

South-western, La Rue Saint-Michel nicknamed Rue de La Soif (Road of Thirst) because there are bars all along this street.

South-eastern, the Champ-Jacquet square, with Renaissance buildings and a statue of mayor Jean Leperdit ripping up a conscription list.

East: Thabor park area 
Area of Saint-Melaine square

Notre-Dame-en-Saint-Melaine basilica,
 Tower and transept from the 11th century Benedictine abbey of Saint-Melaine
 14th century Gothic arcades
 17th century colonnade
 Bell tower topped with a gilded Virgin Mary (19th century)
 17th century cloister

Jardin botanique du Thabor (formal French garden, orangerie, rose garden, aviary) a botanical garden on 10 hectares of land, built between 1860 and 1867.

17th century promenade "la Motte à Madame", and a monumental stairway overlooking the Rue de Paris entrance to the Thabor.

South city centre 
The south city centre is a mix of old buildings and 19th and 20th centuries constructions.

South of the Vilaine
The Fine Arts Museum is situated on Quai Émile Zola, by the Vilaine River.

Les Champs Libres is a building on Esplanade Charles de Gaulle, and was designed by the architect Christian de Portzamparc. It houses the Brittany Museum (Musée de Bretagne), the regional library Bibliothèque de Rennes Métropole with six floors, and the Espace des Sciences science centre with a planetarium.

At Place Honoré Commeurec is Les Halles Centrales, a covered market from 1922, with one part converted into contemporary art gallery.

The Mercure Hotel is located in a restored building on Rue du Pré-Botté, which was the prior location of Ouest-Éclair, and then of Ouest-France, a premier daily regional newspaper.

There are large mills at Rue Duhamel, constructed on each side of the south branch of the Vilaine in 1895 and 1902.

Other sights
To the northwest of Rennes, near Rue de Saint-Malo are the locks of the Canal d'Ille-et-Rance of 1843.

There are two halls of the printer, Oberthür, built by Marthenot between 1870 and 1895 on Rue de Paris in the eastern part of the city. Oberthür Park is the second biggest garden in the city.

The 17th century manor of Haute-Chalais, a granite château, is situated to the south of the city in Blosne Quarter (Bréquigny).

Parks and gardens

Parc du Thabor contains a compact but significant botanical garden, the Jardin botanique du Thabor. The University of Rennes 1, with a campus in the city's eastern section, also contains a botanical garden and collections (the Jardin botanique de l'Université de Rennes).

Economy

Local economy include car manufacturing, telecommunications, digital sector and agrofood.

The ITC firm Orange (ex-France Telecom) is the largest private employer with 4,800 people. PSA Peugeot Citroën, is the second largest private employer in the metropolitan area of Rennes, with 3,000 people. PSA opened a manufacturing plant at La Janais in Chartres-de-Bretagne in 1961. Technicolor, one of the biggest firms in TV and cinema broadcasting in the world employs over 500 people.

Rennes has the second largest concentration of digital and ITC firms in France after Paris (with well-known companies and startups like Atos, Google, Neosoft, Orange S.A., Thales, Ericsson, Harmonic France, STmicroelectronics, Technicolor R&D, Ubisoft, Regionsjob, Capgemini, OVH, Dassault Systèmes, Delta Dore, Canon, Artefacto, Enensys Technologies, Exfo, Mitsubishi Electric R&D Europe, Digitaleo, Kelbillet, Klaxoon, Sopra Group, Niji, and Airbus Cybersecurity). Rennes was one of the first French cities to receive the French Tech label in November 2014. Moreover, Rennes hosts the 3rd public research potential in digital and ITC sectors in France, after Paris and Grenoble, with 3,000 people working in 10 laboratories, like well-known IRISA, IETR, IRMAR, DGA-MI (cyberdefense), and SATIE. It is also the third innovation potential in agrofood French industry with many firms in this field (Lactalis, Triballat Sojasun, Coralis, Panavi, Bridor, Groupe Avril, Loïc Raison, Groupe Roullier, Sanders, etc.), an agro campus (Agrocampus Ouest) and a big international and professional expo, the Space (every year in September).

Other large firms located in Rennes include the restaurant conglomerate Groupe Le Duff (owners of Brioche Dorée, Bruegger's, La Madeleine, Mimi's Cafe, Timothy's World Coffee), the first French newspaper Ouest France (800,000 daily copies) and Samsic Service (cleanliness, industrial safety, job search, etc.).

Culture

Rennes is known to be one of the most festive cities of France. It invests heavily in arts and culture and a number of its festivals (such as the music festival Les Transmusicales, Les Tombées de la Nuit, Mythos, Stunfest (fighting game competition) and Travelling (a cinematic festival)) are well known throughout France. During the 80s, Rennes was often cited as the French town of rock and new wave music.

Concert halls
Rennes is well equipped with musical facilities:
 The MusikHall, for large shows (near the airport). (7,000 seats)
 Le Liberté, dedicated to major cultural events and touring shows. (5,300 seats)
 La Cité, dedicated to contemporary music & local artists. (1,150 seats)
 L'Étage (Le Liberté), dedicated to contemporary music & local artists. (900 seats)
 Rennes's Opera House (650 seats) and National Theatre of Brittany, TNB in French (Vilar room, 950 seats) for the Brittany orchestra.
 The Ubu, an associative concert hall. (500 seats)
 L'Antipode MJC, also an art centre. (500 seats)

Museums and exhibition places
There are also five museums in Rennes:
 Musée des Beaux Arts (Museum of Fine Arts of Rennes). This art museum holds many works by the sculptor Pierre Charles Lenoir
 Musée de Bretagne (Museum of Brittany) at the Champs Libres, together with the 'espace of sciences' and a planetarium.
 Museum of Farming and Rennes Countryside at Bintinais, south of Rennes.
 Musée des Transmissions (Museum of Broadcasting) at Cesson-Sévigné, east of Rennes centre.
 FRAC Bretagne Fond Régional d'Art contemporain (Regional Fund for Contemporary Art).
In addition to this list, there are art facilities such as 40mcube exhibition space or the centre for contemporary art La Criée.

There are also miscellaneous cultural places: the dance dedicated place the Triange, two "Art et Essai" – art house cinemas – cinemas called l'Arvor and Cine TNB. Surrounding cities house many other cultural venues.

Media
Rennes was one of the first towns in France to have its own local television channel 'TV Rennes', created in 1987.

Rennes has also local radio stations (Hit West, Radio Campus, Canal B, Radio Caroline, Radio Rennes, Radio Laser) and local newspapers or magazines (Ouest-France, Le Mensuel de Rennes, Place Publique, 20 Minutes Rennes).

Local culture

Local languages

In Brittany, two regional languages are spoken: Breton and Gallo. In and around Rennes, Gallo was traditionally spoken as a local language, but Breton has always been spoken by regional migrants coming from the western part of the region.

Nowadays, the Breton language is taught in two Diwan schools, some bilingual public and Catholic schools, in evening courses, and in university.

The municipality launched a linguistic plan through Ya d'ar brezhoneg on 24 January 2008.

In 2008, 2.87% of primary school children were enrolled in bilingual primary schools, and the number of pupils enrolled in these schools is steadily growing.

Local food
 
Specialties from Rennes include:
 Breton galette
 Galette-saucisse
 Crêpe
 Cider

Many other Breton specialties (seafood, milk, vegetables, cheese, meat) are seen at the Marché des Lices, a weekly market held every Saturday morning (one of the most important markets in France).

Education

The Rennes agglomeration has a large student population (around 63,000).

The city has two main universities; Université de Rennes 1, which offers courses in science, technology, medicine, philosophy, law, management, and economics, and Université Rennes 2, which has courses in the arts, literature, languages, communication, human and social sciences, and sport. The official website of Université Rennes 2 identifies that facility as "the largest research and higher learning institution in Arts, Literature, Languages, Social Sciences and Humanities in the West of France."

There are a few École Supérieures in Rennes, like the École Normale Supérieure de Rennes on the Ker Lann campus, just outside Rennes, the Institut d'études politiques de Rennes or the ESC Rennes School of Business.

There is also branches of École Supérieure d'Électricité – Supélec and Telecom Bretagne in the east of the city (Cesson-Sévigné), a campus of the École pour l'informatique et les nouvelles technologies, a campus of the École pour l'informatique et les techniques avancées, and the grande école Institut National des Sciences Appliquées, which is next to the École nationale supérieure de chimie de Rennes.

The computer science and applied mathematics research institute, IRISA, is located on the campus of the Université des Sciences, near Cesson-Sévigné. The Délégation Générale pour l'Armement (defence procurement agency) operates the CELAR research centre, dedicated to electronics and computing, in Bruz, a neighbouring town.

Catholic University of Rennes (Institut Catholique de Rennes) is a Catholic university founded in 1989.

The city is also home to an American study abroad program for high school students, School Year Abroad, in which students are immersed in French culture through five classes in the language and a nine-month home stay.

The École Compleméntaire Japonaise de Rennes (レンヌ補習授業校 Rennu Hoshū Jugyō Kō), a part-time Japanese supplementary school, is held in the Collège Anne de Bretagne in Rennes.

Sport

Football club

 Rennes is home to Stade Rennais F.C., who plays in Ligue 1 at the Roazhon Park stadium.

Handball
 Cesson-Sévigné is home to Cesson-Rennes-Métropole handball, who plays in division 1.

Road bicycle
 Rennes is home to Fortuneo-Vital Concept (UCI Team Code: BSE), a professional cycling team.

Rugby
 Rennes is home to Stade Rennais Rugby, a women's rugby team who plays in Championnat de France de rugby à XV féminin, which is the top national competition for women's rugby union football clubs in France. Rennes is also home to REC Rugby, a men's team competing in Fédérale 1, the fourth tier of the Men's Rugby Union championship.

Transport

Rennes has well-developed national road, rail and air links.

Public transport

Local transport is based primarily on an extensive bus network (65 lines) and a light metro line that was inaugurated in March 2002 and cost €500 million to build. A second light metro line known as Line B was opened on September 20, 2022 after 8 years of construction.

Cycling

Rennes provides other modes of local transport: a bike sharing system with 900 bicycles (named vélo STAR). Rennes created the first system of modern French bike sharing (1998).

Roads

The city is an important hub of Brittany's motorway network and is surrounded by a ring road: the Rocade (national road 136). The construction of the bypass was started in 1968 and completed in 1999. It is 31 km (18.5 mi) long, it has 2 lanes each way (sometimes 3 lanes) and toll free. Many other expressways are connected to the Rennes ring road for local and regional service. By road, Saint-Malo can be reached in 45 minutes, Nantes in 1 hour, Brest in 2 hours and 30 minutes, Paris in 4 hours, Bordeaux in 5 hours and Brussels in 6 hours and 30 minutes.

Railway

Rennes has a major French railway station, the Gare de Rennes, opened in 1857. Since 2 July 2017, it is now one hour twenty-seven minutes by TGV high-speed train from Paris (after the extension of the High Speed Rail Line). Train service is available to other big cities in France such as Lyon, Marseille, Lille and Strasbourg.

Rennes is also an important railway station for regional transport in Brittany. The TER Bretagne provides links to Saint-Malo, Nantes, Redon, Vitré, Saint-Brieuc, Vannes, Laval, Brest and many other regional cities. It is served by Gares station on the VAL Rennes Metro.

Airport

It notably operates regular or seasonal flights to Paris-Charles de Gaulle, Lyon, Marseille, Nice, Toulouse, Barcelona, Palma de Mallorca, Rome-Fiumicino, Southampton, Dublin, Exeter, Manchester, Amsterdam Schiphol, Madrid Barajas, Birmingham, London-City, London-Gatwick and daily flights to London Southend Airport with Flybe.

Notable people 
 Soazig Aaron (born 1949), writer
 Bertrand d'Argentré (1519–1590), jurist and historian, seneschal of Rennes in 1547 than head of the présidial court
 Emmanuel-Marie Blain de Saint-Aubin (1833–1883), educator, songwriter, story-teller, and translator
 Georges Ernest Boulanger (1837–1891), general and politician, born in Rennes
 Jean-Claude Bourlès (born 1937), writer and traveler
 Nicolas Courjal (born 1973), operatic bass
 Maxime Daniel (born 1991), professional cyclist
 Madeleine Desroseaux (1873–1939), poet and novelist
 Yvonne Dubel (1881–1958), soprano opera singer
 Félix Dujardin (1801–1860), professor and dean of the University of Rennes, famous parasitologist
 René Guillou (1903–1958), composer and organist
 Paul Jausions (1835–1870), musicologist specialising in Gregorian chant
 Hélène Jégado (1803–1852), executed serial poisoner
 Matthieu Lahaye (born 1984), racing driver
 Pierre-Emmanuel Le Goff (born 1979), film director, producer and distributor
 Jacques Legrand (born 1946), linguist and anthropologist, specialising in Mongolian literature, language and history
 Malika Ménard (born 1987), Miss France 2010
 Sylvaine Neveu (born 1968), chemist and scientific director of the Solvay group
 Louis Pérouas (1923–2011), priest and historian
 François-Henri Pinault (born 1962), chairman and CEO of Kering.
 René Pleven (1901–1993), twice President of the Council of Ministers
 Pierre Robiquet (1780–1840), chemist member of the Académie des Sciences, discoverer of codein, asparagin and alizarin among others
 Valentina Tronel (born 2009), singer, winner of the Junior Eurovision Song Contest 2020 and former member of Kids United Nouvelle Génération
 Charles Vanel (1892–1989), actor

International relations

Twin towns – sister cities

Rennes is twinned with:

 Exeter, England, UK (since 1956)
 Rochester, New York, USA (since 1958)
 Erlangen, Germany (since 1964)
 Brno, Czech Republic (since 1965)
 Sendai, Japan (since 1967)
 Leuven, Belgium (since 1980)
 Sétif, Algeria (since 1982)
 Cork, Ireland (since 1982)
 Almaty, Kazakhstan (since 1991)
 Bandiagara Cercle, Mali (since 1995)
 Poznań, Poland (since 1998)
 Sibiu, Romania (since 1999)
 Jinan, China (since 2002)

Other forms of cooperation
Friendly towns within France
 Saint-Gilles-du-Mené, France (since 1978)
 Rennes-les-Bains, France (since 1985)

Pacts of cooperation
 Huế, Vietnam (since 1992)

Sponsorship
 Vouziers, France

Rennes also has the only Institut Franco-Américain in France.

Broadcasting facilities
 Transmitter Rennes-Thourie

Cityscape

See also
Communes of the Ille-et-Vilaine department
List of works of the two Folgoët ateliers

References

External links

 Official site
 City council website 
 Parlement of Brittany

 
Communes of Ille-et-Vilaine
Cities in Brittany
Cities in France
Prefectures in France
Gallia Lugdunensis